Siegfried Rasswalder (born 13 May 1987) is an Austrian football player who plays for ESV Knittelfeld.

References

External links
 

1987 births
Living people
Austrian footballers
LASK players
SV Horn players
TSV Hartberg players
Association football defenders
Austria youth international footballers
Austria under-21 international footballers